In geometry, the zone theorem is a result that establishes the complexity of the zone of a line in an arrangement of lines.

Definition

History

Then, in 2011, Rom Pinchasi  proved that the complexity of the zone of a line in an arrangement is at most , and this is a tight bound. 

Some paradigms used in the different proofs of the theorem are induction, sweep technique, tree construction, and Davenport-Schinzel sequences.

Generalizations

Although the most popular version is for arrangements of lines in the plane, there exist some generalizations of the zone theorem. There are considerably fewer proofs for the theorem for dimension . For the -dimensional case, there are proofs based on sweep techniques and for higher dimensions is used Euler’s relation: 

Another generalization is considering arrangements of pseudolines (and pseudohyperplanes in dimension ) instead of lines (and hyperplanes). Some proofs for the theorem work well in this case since they do not use the straightness of the lines substantially through their arguments.

Motivation

The primary motivation to study the zone complexity in arrangements arises from looking for efficient algorithms to construct arrangements. A classical algorithm is the incremental construction, which can be roughly described as adding the lines one after the other and storing all faces generated by each in an appropriate data structure (the usual structure for arrangements is the doubly connected edge list (DCEL)). Here, the consequence of the zone theorem is that the entire construction of any arrangement of  lines can be done in time , since the insertion of each line takes time .

Notes

References

.

.

.
.

.

.

.

.

.

.

Euclidean plane geometry
Theorems in plane geometry